Thout 26 - Coptic Calendar - Thout 28

The twenty-seventh day of the Coptic month of Thout, the first month of the Coptic year. On a common year, this day corresponds to September 24, of the Julian Calendar, and October 7, of the Gregorian Calendar. This day falls in the Coptic season of Akhet, the season of inundation.

Commemorations

Saints 

 The martyrdom of Saint Eustathius, his two sons, and his wife

References 

Days of the Coptic calendar